The 2014–15 A-1 League was the 24th season of the A-1 League, the highest professional basketball league in Croatia.

The first half of the season consisted of 10 teams and 90-game regular season. For second half of the season clubs was divided into two groups. Championship group consisted of 3 teams from ABA League and the best 5 teams from first half of the season. Relegation group consisted of bottom 5 teams from first half of the season.

Cedevita won its second Croatian league title against Cibona with a 3–1 win in the final series.

Teams and venues
Withdrew
Križevci (11th)
Promoted from A-2 Liga
Ribola Kaštela (Champion)
Gorica (Runner-up)

Regular season

Results

Championship round

Relegation and promotion rounds

Relegation round

Teams "carried" the results of the matches played between them from the regular season.

Promotion round

Relegation/Promotion play-off
Relegation league 5th-placed team  faces the 2nd-placed Promotion league side  in a two-legged play-off. The winner on aggregate score after both matches will earn a spot in the 2015–16 A-1 League.

Hermes Analitica vs. Split

Split retained its A-1 League status.

Playoffs

Bracket

External links
Official Site 
Scoresway Page
Eurobasket.com League Page

A-1 Liga seasons
Croatian
A1